The 1994 National Hockey League All-Star Game was held in Madison Square Garden in New York City, home of the New York Rangers, on January 22, 1994. 

It was the 45th All-Star Game held in NHL history and the first to be rebranded under the year the game was held rather then the edition title.

Super Skills Competition 
The Western Conference would win the Skills Competition for the second straight season.  In the individual events Al Iafrate won the Hardest Shot event for the second straight season, while both John Vanbiesbrouck and Patrick Roy would share the Goaltenders Competition victory. In addition, the Puck Control Relay event would be introduced as part of the individual competition with its first winner being Russ Courtnall.

Individual Event winners 
 Puck Control Relay – Russ Courtnall (Dallas Stars)
 Fastest Skater – Sergei Fedorov (Detroit Red Wings) – 13.525 seconds
 Accuracy Shooting - Brendan Shanahan (St. Louis Blues) – 4 hits, 5 shots
 Hardest Shot – Al Iafrate (Washington Capitals) – 102.7 mph
 Goaltenders Competition – John Vanbiesbrouck (Florida Panthers)/Patrick Roy (Montreal Canadiens) – 4 GA, 16 shots

The game 
A capacity crowd saw Ottawa Senators' rookie Alexei Yashin score with 3:42 left in the third period, to give the Eastern Conference a 9–8 victory. The Western Conference were leading 8–6 in the third period, until Quebec Nordiques' centre Joe Sakic scored his first All-Star Game goal to cut the lead to 8–7. Florida Panthers' centre Bob Kudelski then scored with 6:01 left to tie the game at 8–8, before Yashin would score the eventual game-winner. New York Rangers' goaltender Mike Richter was named All-Star MVP after he saved 19 of 21 shots in the second period, including three saves on breakaways by sniper Pavel Bure. Kudelski was added onto the Eastern Conference lineup due to injuries to Mario Lemieux, who along with Ed Belfour were the highest-profile players among the several players on the rosters who were unable to play due to injury. (Curtis Joseph was the only injured player who played in this game.)

Other first time All-Stars in New York included all three Western Conference goaltenders—the Toronto Maple Leafs' Felix Potvin (who started in place of Ed Belfour), the San Jose Sharks' Arturs Irbe and the Blues' Curtis Joseph (the game's losing goaltender, who gave up the winning goal in the third period). This was the most recent All-Star Game in which the head coaches were also the head coaches of the defending conference champions (Barry Melrose was the Western Conference's head coach and Jacques Demers was the Eastern Conference's head coach).

Uniforms
The 1994 All-Star Game saw the most radical departure from All-Star uniform design since the star-laden 1982 All-Star Game uniforms. The NHL retired the use of its league colors of black and orange, and had the uniforms designed based on the new Eastern and Western Conference logos. Both uniforms featured a giant star-based pattern across the entirety of the uniform, utilizing a dye-sublimation process that had been piloted in the National Basketball Association. The Eastern team's jersey featured a teal star pattern over a white base, while the Western team wore purple over a black base. Silver trim (along with the reverse of the base color) separated the star pattern from the base. The respective conference logos appeared on the front, replacing the NHL shield.

The NHL All-Star shield, an orange version of the NHL logo with five black sticks forming the outline of a white star, had been worn on the left shoulder of the uniform since 1983. The patch was retired for this game, replaced with a patch featuring each player's individual team logo.

This uniform design would continue to be used through the 1997 All-Star Game, with one minor change - the names and sleeve numbers on the Eastern jerseys would be changed from black to white. These uniforms would also provide the inspiration for the Dallas Stars to redesign their uniforms later in the decade, introducing their green version as a third jersey in 1997 and adding a white version in 1999.

Summary

Referee: Bill McCreary
Linesmen: Gord Broseker, Pat Dapuzzo
Television: NBC, CBC

Rosters

National Anthem
The American national anthem was sung by Taylor Dayne.

Notes

See also 
1993–94 NHL season

All-Star Game
National Hockey League All-Star Game
1990s in Manhattan
National Hockey League All-Star Game
Madison Square Garden
National Hockey League All-Star Games
Sports in Manhattan
Ice hockey competitions in New York City